Old Dorm Block is a building on the Reed College campus in Portland, Oregon, in the United States. It was built in 1912 and remodeled in 1992.

References

External links
 

1912 establishments in Oregon
Buildings and structures completed in 1912
Reed College buildings
University and college buildings completed in 1912